Jalan Enam Kaki (Six Feet Road) (Selangor state route B24) is a major road in Selangor, Malaysia.

List of junctions

Roads in Selangor